The Journal of Public Affairs Education is a quarterly peer-reviewed academic journal of public administration education that is published by Routledge on behalf of the Network of Schools of Public Policy, Affairs, and Administration. Since 2017, the editors-in-chief are Bruce D. McDonald, III (North Carolina State University) and William Hatcher (Augusta University).

History
The journal was established in 1995 by H. George Frederickson as the Journal of Public Administration Education. Initially published in coordination with the American Society for Public Administration's Section on Public Administration Education (SPAE), the National Association of Schools of Public Affairs and Administration (NASPAA) began discussions in 1996 on sponsoring the journal. In the fall of 1997, Frederickson transferred ownership of the journal to NASPAA. Under the new ownership, the name of the journal was changed to the current one to reflect the breadth of NASPAA's mission and to increase the appeal of the journal. Despite the change in name and ownership, the journal has continued to maintain a loose affiliation with SPAE.

From 1997, the journal was published by NASPAA; since January 2018 production and distribution were moved to Routledge.

Editors-in-chief
The following persons have been editors-in-chief:

Abstracting and indexing
The journal is abstracted and indexed in:
 Emerging Sources Citation Index
 EBSCO databases
 PAIS International
 ProQuest databases
 Scopus

See also
List of public administration journals

References

External links

Routledge academic journals
Public administration journals
Quarterly journals
English-language journals
Publications established in 1995